Hung Hua Construction (HCC) is a major Taiwanese construction contractor which specializes is coastal and offshore work.

Overview
Hung Hua Construction is the largest maritime engineering company in Taiwan.

They are based in Taichung, Taiwan.

History
HCC helped Jan De Nul set up their operations in Taiwan and has partnered with them on a number of projects.

Fleet
HCC has the largest fleet of nearshore working vessels in Taiwan. In 2019 HCC ordered a pair of crew transfer vessels from Damen Group. The two vessels were delivered in January 2021 with a third ordered.

A number of HCC's vessels are operated by wholly owned subsidiary Dong Fang Offshore (DFO).

Vessels
 DF Buffalo, 330 ft barge
 Orient No. 8, Anchor handling tug
 Falcon No. 5, Damen FCS 2710
 Falcon No. 6, Damen FCS 2710

Awards
The Taiwanese Public Construction Commission has awarded HCC two Gold Quality Medals and High Distinction Award.

References

Companies based in Taichung
Construction and civil engineering companies of Taiwan